Ali Beyglu (also Romanized as ‘Alī Beyglū; also known as ‘Alībeglū) is a village in Zarrineh Rud Rural District, in the Central District of Miandoab County, West Azerbaijan Province, Iran. At the 2006 census, its population was 1,005, in 255 families.

References 

Populated places in Miandoab County